Maurice Raes (17 January 1907 – 23 February 1992) was a Belgian racing cyclist. He won the 1927 edition of the Liège–Bastogne–Liège.

References

External links

1907 births
1992 deaths
Belgian male cyclists
People from Destelbergen
Cyclists from East Flanders